This is a list of Trinity College, Kandy alumni , located in Sri Lanka.

Politicians 
 
 Lakshman Kadirgamar – former Sri Lankan Foreign minister
 Theodore Braybrooke Panabokke – High Commissioner to New Delhi, India
 Sarath Amunugama – Sri Lankan Cabinet Minister (Min. of Public Administration and Home Affairs), Minister 
 Lionel Gamini Dissanayake PC – presidential candidate, United National Party; Leader of the Opposition, Minister of Lands, Land Development and Mahaweli Development
 Kabir Hashim – Former cabinet minister and MP for Kegalle
 Edwin Loku Banda Hurulle – Former Cabinet Minister of Communications and Cultural Affairs
 Lakshman Jayakody – Former Cabinet Minister for Religious Affairs 
 Sir Tikiri Bandara Panabokke – Ceylonese Cabinet Minister and Member of the Legislative Council
 Anuruddha Ratwatte – former Minister of Power and Energy and Deputy Minister of Defence 
 Edward Lionel Senanayake – Speaker of the Parliament of Sri Lanka
 Hector Kobbekaduwa - Former cabinet minister and Presidential candidate
 Tissa Vitharana – Former Cabinet minister and the leader of Lanka Sama Samaja Party (LSSP)
 Batty Weerakoon – Former Cabinet minister and the leader of Lanka Sama Samaja Party (LSSP)
 Tissa Balalla – Former MP for Kurunegala & Governor of North Western Province
 Barnes Ratwatte Dissawe -Member of the State Council and the Senate of Ceylon. (Father of Sirimavo_Bandaranaike)
 Lohan Ratwatte - MP for Kandy District
 Shelton Ranaraja - Former MP for Senkadagala & Deputy Minister of Justice 
 P. C. Imbulana- Former MP for Ruwanwella, Minister of labour & Governor of Central Province 
 Shanakiya Rasamanickam - Member of Parliament - Batticaloa District (TNA)
 P.T.R. Palanivel Rajan - Former Speaker of the Tamil Nadu Legislative Assembly & former Minister for Hindu Religious and Charitable Endowments in the Government of Tamil Nadu.

Civil servants

Mayors 
 Sir Cuda Ratwatte – first Kandyan Knight; first Mayor of Kandy
 Fredrick de Silva – former Mayor of Kandy
 Mahendra Ratwatte – former Mayor of Kandy
 Kesera Senanayake - Mayor of Kandy

Missionaries

Arts

Judiciary

Military

Sri Lanka Army

Indian Army

Police

Sports

Academics

Commerce

References 

Trinity College, Kandy alumni